Magazines in Portugal are mostly women's magazines, society magazines and TV magazines. In 1994 there were nearly 984 magazines in the country.

The following is an incomplete list of current and defunct magazines published in Portugal. They may be published in Portuguese or in other languages.

A

 Activa
 Alma feminina
 Amanhã
 Árvore
 Atlantida
 Azulejos

B
 Blitz

C

 Caras
 Centauro
 Contemporânea
 Contestável

E

 Essential Lisboa
 Essential Madeira
 Exame
 Exame Informática

F

 As Farpas
 Flama
 Focus
 Fortuna

G
 Grande Reportagem

L
 A Leitura

M

 Mais Alto
 Maria
 Maxima
 Media XXI
 Mística
 Mundo Literário

N
 Nova Gente

P
 Portugal Colonial
 Portugal Socialista
 Presença

R
 Revista ACP
 Roda dos Milhoes

S
 Sábado
 Sudoeste

T
 Teleculinária 
 Telenovelas
 TV Guia

V
 Variante
 Visão
 Vogue Portugal

See also
 List of newspapers in Portugal
 Media of Portugal

References

Portugal
Magazines